Arthur T. Polhill-Turner (7 February 1862 – 21 November 1935) was an English missionary. He was one of the Cambridge Seven, seven young men from England that travelled to China in order to continue Hudson Taylor's missionary work there.

Early life
Arthur Polhill-Turner was born on 7 February 1862. He was educated at Eton College and Trinity Hall, Cambridge.

Christian evangelism
 In November 1882, Polhill-Turner was deeply moved by the American evangelist Dwight L. Moody’s talks to Trinity students.  Recognizing the seriousness of following Christ, he only decided to follow him after thoroughly thinking through the implications of such a decision. He was the first of the Cambridge Seven to have the inkling that China was for him, and soon after his decision to follow Christ he began to pursue this desire with intensity, convincing a few of the others to join him. In 1885 he and his brother, Cecil Polhill, became affiliated with the China Inland Mission (CIM).

Initially signed up with the Church Missionary Society (CMS) before switching to the CIM, Arthur, now an ordained Anglican, retained a strong connection to the CMS even though he was technically a CIM missionary. He left for China on 5 February 1885. Together with Montagu Proctor-Beauchamp and William Cassels, the three established a proper Church of England diocese in Szechwan.

He spent ten years in Bazhong between 1888 and 1898, before relocating to Dazhou in 1899. On 23 February 1904, construction of a large multi-purpose Gospel Hall, or Gospel Church started in Dazhou, under the supervision of Arthur, and was complete by August. A number of outstations were established following the building's completion.

Death
He died on 21 November 1935.

See also 
 Anglicanism in Sichuan

References 

1862 births
1935 deaths
People educated at Eton College
Alumni of Trinity College, Cambridge
Anglican missionaries in Sichuan
British expatriates in China
English Anglican missionaries
Diocese of Szechwan